Mei Hoom Moosa is a 2022 Indian Malayalam-language satire comedy film directed by Jibu Jacob and written by Rubesh Rain. Produced by Dr. Roy C. J. and Thomas Thiruvalla under the banners of Confident Group and Thomas Thiruvalla Films, the film stars Suresh Gopi in the lead role while Poonam Bajwa and Saiju Kurup play prominent supporting roles. Sreenath Sivasankaran composed the film's music, and the cinematography was handled by Vishnu Narayanan.

Principal photography commenced in April 2022. Mei Hoom Moosa was released in cinemas on 30 September 2022. The film received mixed reviews upon its release.

Plot
Lance naik Muhammad Moosa, an Indian army soldier returns to his hometown in Kerala, after spending nineteen years in a Pakistani jail. On his homecoming, he finds that the entire world has presumed him to be dead during the Kargil War. How Moosa sets about to prove his identity while also trying to come to terms with everything that has happened around him during his time behind bars, forms the plot of the story.

Cast

Production
Principal photography of the film commenced on 21 April 2022 at Kodungallur, Kerala. It was reported that an initial filming had also been completed in North India. Filming had taken place across Kargil, Poonch, Delhi, Jaipur, Ponnani, Malappuram and the Wagah border in Punjab. The entire filming was completed by July 2022.

Release
The film has its theatrical release on 30 September 2022. It was subsequently acquired by ZEE5 for a digital release on November 11, 2022.

References

External links
 
Mei Hoom Moosa on ZEE5

2022 films
Indian satirical films
Indian comedy films
Films shot in Kozhikode
Films shot in Jaipur
Films shot in Rajasthan
Films shot in Ladakh
Films shot in Jammu and Kashmir
Films shot in Punjab, India
Indian Army in films